In a horn loudspeaker, the term acoustic transformer or acoustical transformer may refer to either of two components:
Horn (acoustic), which attaches to the compression driver unit
Phase plug, a component within the compression driver, the interface between the diaphragm and the horn